Art of Murder: FBI Confidential is an adventure video game, first game in the Art of Murder series. Originally released by Polish developer City Interactive in 2008, the game has been released on Steam.

Plot and gameplay 
The game sees the player solve a series of murders through detective techniques.

Development 
The team, which had previously produced titles like Schizm, Sentinel: Descendants in Time, and Reah, announced this title on July 5, 2007. It was released in France on August 21, 2008.

Critical reception 
Art of Murder: FBI Confidential garnered generally average reviews, and holds an average of 50/100 on aggregate web site Metacritic.

IGN appreciated that the game didn't require moon logic. Adventure Gamers felt the title offered a detective experience without the painstaking realism of Police Quest or CSI. GamesRadar criticised the plot, writing, and voiceacting. WorthPlaying wrote that the title failed as a murder investigation game. JeuxVideo found the game to be bland and generic.

Sequels
Several sequels were released, all developed and published by City Interactive:

 Art of Murder: Hunt for the Puppeteer – (2009, Windows)
 Art of Murder: The Secret Files – (2009, Windows)
 Art of Murder: Cards of Destiny – (2010, Windows)
 Crime Lab: Body of Evidence – (2010, Nintendo DS)
 Art of Murder: Deadly Secrets – (2011, Windows)

References

External links 

2008 video games
Adventure games
CI Games games
Detective video games
Single-player video games
Video games about police officers
Video games developed in Poland
Video games featuring female protagonists
Windows games
Windows-only games